Russian Cup (Кубок России) is a cup competition for Russian bandy teams, held almost every year since 1937. Originally, it was called the Soviet Cup. The cup is now administered by the Russian Bandy Federation. To be eligible to play in the Russian Bandy Super League, a club have to play the cup.

Sources

Bandy competitions in Russia
National bandy cups